Proflavine, also called proflavin and diaminoacridine, is an acriflavine derivative, a disinfectant bacteriostatic against many gram-positive bacteria. It has been used in the form of the dihydrochloride and hemisulfate salts as a topical antiseptic, and was formerly used as a urinary antiseptic.

Proflavine is also known to have a mutagenic effect on DNA by intercalating between nucleic acid base pairs. It differs from most other mutagenic components by causing basepair-deletions or basepair-insertions and not substitutions. In the presence of light, proflavine can induce double-stranded breaks in DNA.

Proflavine absorbs strongly in the blue region at 445 nm (in water at pH 7) with molar extinction coefficient of c. 40,000.

References

Antiseptics
Acridines
DNA intercalaters